

Gregory Paul McLaren (born 1971), who goes by the name of Lucky Diamond Rich, is a New Zealand-British performance artist, street performer and international performing arts festival performer, whose acts include sword swallowing and juggling on a unicycle.

He is best known, however, for holding the Guinness World Record as "the world's most tattooed person", a title formerly held by Englishman Tom Leppard. Rich has tattoos covering his entire body, including the insides of his eyelids, mouth, ears and foreskin. He has held the certified record since 2006, being 100 percent tattooed.

Inspiration and first tattoo
As a young boy, he read about and became interested in the most tattooed men and women. It did not go much further than just a thought until he got his first tattoo, which was of a small juggling club on his hip.

He went on to tattoo every part of his body including every crevice and intimate area. He has tattooed some white over his black tattoos and added colour. His tattoos have collectively taken over a thousand hours to ink, and have been worked on by hundreds of tattoo artists.

See also
 Body suit (tattoo)
 Tattoo art style

References

External links

1971 births
Living people
People known for being heavily tattooed
Sword swallowers
Street theatre
New Zealand artists
Jugglers
Guinness World Records